Agustín Rodríguez may refer to:

 Fray Agustín Rodríguez of the Chamuscado and Rodríguez Expedition
 Agustín Rodríguez Santiago (born 1959), Spanish footballer
 Agustín Rodríguez (footballer, born 2004), Argentine footballer